Rollin' Thunder is an Australian television show currently broadcast on Fox Sports. The program showcases matches from The Australian Bowling Cup, a newly developed ten-pin bowling tournament held at Oz Tenpin Epping in Melbourne, Australia. Featuring two matches per episode, the tournament will showcase 18 of Australia's best bowlers in a baker style triples format which will see both female and male bowlers feature in six teams, culminating in the grand final to determine the overall winners.

The debut season aired from December 2017 on the free-to-air channel 7mate, with teammates George Frilingos and Jarrod Langford winning the inaugural event.

The second season aired over a two-week period from 10 December 2018 on Fox Sports channel 506.

2017 Tournament
The inaugural tournament in 2017 was recorded on 14 October 2017 at Tenpin City Lidcombe in Sydney, Australia, and premiered on 7mate on Sunday 3 December 2017. Sixteen bowlers competed in the event, who were separated into eight teams of two people. Teams were then split into two even pools, which resulted in each team playing three matches in the qualifying rounds. The 2017 tournament aired across seven episodes, with each episode featuring two matches.

The series reached over 694,000 viewers in metropolitan and regional TV markets over its seven-week run. The show was presented by Peter Psaltis, who commentated alongside Paul Delany and Daniel Webb, with guest commentary appearances from Jason Belmonte.

The following teams were named:

Season 1 (2017)
Note: Winners are listed in bold and ties are listed in italics, with game scores listed in brackets

2018 Tournament
The 2018 tournament was recorded on 10 November 2018 at Oz Tenpin Epping in Melbourne, Australia, and is premiered on Fox Sports from 10 December 2018. Eighteen bowlers competed in the event, after being separated into six teams of three people, each representing an Australian state and bowling centre.

The show was presented by Peter Psaltis, with expert commentary from Chris Commane and Jeanette Baker.

The following teams were named:

Season 2 (2018)
Note: Winners are listed in bold, with game scores listed in brackets

See also
 List of Australian television series

References

External links
Facebook Page
7Plus

2017 Australian television series debuts
Ten-pin bowling competitions
Ten-pin bowling in Australia
Recurring sporting events established in 2017